The Ministry of Education (translit. Misrad HaHinukh) is the branch of the Israeli government charged with overseeing public education institutions in Israel. The department is headed by the Minister of Education, who is a member of the cabinet. The ministry has previously included culture and sport, although this is now covered by the Ministry of Culture and Sport.

History

In the first decade of statehood, the education system was faced with the task of establishing a network of kindergartens and schools for a rapidly growing student population. In 1949, there were 80,000 elementary school students. By 1950, there were 120,000 - an increase of 50 percent within the span of one year. Israel also took over responsibility for the education of Arab schoolchildren. The first minister of education was Zalman Shazar, later president of the State of Israel.    
Since 2002, the Ministry of Education has awarded a National Education Award to five top localities in recognizing excellence in investing substantial resources in the educational system. In 2012, first place was awarded to the Shomron Regional Council and followed by Or Yehuda, Tiberias, Eilat and Beersheba. The prize has been awarded to a variety of educational institutions including kindergartens and elementary schools.

List of ministers

References

External links
Official website
All Ministers in the Ministry of Education and Culture Knesset website

Education
Ministry of Education
Education
 
Education in Israel